"Baby's on Fire" is the third track on English musician Brian Eno's 1974 debut solo album Here Come the Warm Jets.

Writing and recording
Eno recorded "Baby's on Fire" during the Here Come the Warm Jets sessions in September 1973 at Majestic Studios, London, where he had previously recorded the majority of his earlier material. The track was produced by Eno, who handled production and mixing duties on the bulk of the album's recording, and was created with musicians Simon King, Marty Simon, Robert Fripp, Paul Rudolph, and John Wetton. The song is a surreal fantasy about a photography session involving a burning woman and unthinking, laughing onlookers, and two second-hand tobacconists.

Live recordings of the song have appeared on various Eno recordings, the first being June 1, 1974, performed with Kevin Ayers, John Cale, Ollie Halsall and Eddie Sparrow. Eno spoke positively about this performance, saying, "The instruments were incredibly out of tune, so out of tune you wouldn’t believe it. But it sounds fantastic. There’s one little bit in it where there’s a riff between the guitar and one of the bassists, and they’re so out of tune it sounds like cellos. Amazing! I mean if you tried to make that sound in the studio it would have taken you ages. You wouldn’t have thought of making it, in fact, it’s such a bizarre sound. And the piano and guitar are quite well out of tune as well. Ha!"

Musical composition
The album version of "Baby's on Fire" is 5 minutes 19 seconds long. The song begins with a tense hi-hat and bass line, along several different kinds of electronic sounds. Eno's vocals enter after this, being described as "nasal" and "slightly snotty." Following this first section of lyrics there is a three-minute guitar solo by Robert Fripp, that he played after he "just gotten off a plane from America. I had the flu. I was exhausted", with shifting drum beats as backing; Eno's vocal returns as the song ends. The last line sung by Eno is, "The temperature's rising, and any idiot would know that." In the 801 Live version performed by 801, the last line says, "But any idiot could see that!"

Release and reception
"Baby's on Fire" has received positive reviews from critics, mainly noting the guitar solo. Douglas Wolk of Blender described the song as "a two-note wonder built around an all-hell-breaks-loose guitar meltdown by King Crimson's Robert Fripp", while Chris Ott of Pitchfork Media called the track "earth-shattering".
"Baby's on Fire" was featured prominently in the 1998 film Velvet Goldmine, with vocals provided by the film's star, Jonathan Rhys Meyers.

In 2022, Pitchfork named it the 192nd best song of the 1970s, saying "there's a lot going on in this song: a celebration of a catastrophe happening in plain view, knotty wordplay and snappy onomatopoeia, and the vicious camp of Eno’s vocal. The track’s centerpiece is the conflagration of Robert Fripp and Paul Rudolph's all-devouring instrumental break with Eno’s "treatments" spraying fuel all over it."

Personnel

Musicians
Eno – vocals, synthesizers, guitar treatments, keyboards, instrumental arrangements
Robert Fripp – guitar
Simon King – drums
Paul Rudolph – guitar
Marty Simon – percussion
John Wetton – bass guitar

Technical personnel
Brian Eno – producer, mixer
Chris Thomas – mixer
Derek Chandler – recording engineer
Denny Bridges, Phil Chapman, Paul Hardiman – mixing engineers
Arun Chakraverty – mastering

Notes

Sources

External links
"Baby's on Fire" at Last.fm

Brian Eno songs
Songs written by Brian Eno
Song recordings produced by Brian Eno
1974 songs